Malawach or Melawwaḥ, (literally means "board-like bread"), is a flatbread that is traditional in Yemenite Jewish cuisine. It was brought to Israel by Yemenite Jews. Malawach resembles a thick pancake but consists of thin layers of puff pastry brushed with oil or fat and cooked flat in a frying pan. It is traditionally served with hard-boiled eggs, zhug, and a crushed or grated tomato dip. Sometimes it is served with honey.

History

Malawach is made from the same dough as jachnun, a Yemenite Jewish Shabbat bread, and both originated as a variation of hojaldre, a Sephardic Jewish puff pastry, brought to Yemen by Jews expelled from Spain. Hojaldre later became "ajin", an enriched dough only made by the Yemenite Jews, and was not made by the non-Jewish Yemenis, according to Rabbi Gil Marks, a Jewish food historian

Preparation

Malawach was traditionally prepared at home by the women in the Yemenite Jewish community, and is made out of a laminated dough similar to puff pastry that has been enriched with either butter, Clarified butter, or margarine if pareve; creating a very flaky consistency with many layers, similar to a croissant. The dough is divided into balls, and is rolled out and then commonly placed between wax paper and placed in the freezer. It is then fried in a small amount of oil from a frozen state, as if it is fried fresh the butter or other fat will seep out of the dough, making it harder to work with and not flaky. Freezing the dough helps the butter or other fat remain in solid form once the malawach comes into contact with the hot oil, causing the creation of its signature flaky layers, and causing the bread to rise somewhat. Malawach is typically fried as one large flatbread, though sometimes it is fried in smaller pieces. It is served hot, traditionally with zhoug, resek, and beitzah (hardboiled egg), although a variety of other pairings and dips are now popular as well such as honey, jam, labneh, shakshouka, baba ghanoush, matbucha, and muhammara, among others.

Popularity in Israel

Malawach has historically been a staple of the Yemenite Jews. Through exodus of Yemenite Jews from Yemen in the mid-20th century, and their subsequent refuge in Israel, it has become a very popular dish in Israel, and a favorite comfort food for Israelis of all backgrounds and origins. Malawach is traditionally made at home by members of the Yemenite Jewish community, but with the newfound, widespread popularity of malawach in Israel in recent decades it is now commonly served at restaurants in Israel, many of which are dedicated to serving malawach, and related dishes such as jachnun. It is commonly used as a sandwich wrap similar to a laffa, and is commonly served with shakshouka, hummus, sabich, and many other dishes. It is also commonly served as a dessert with labneh and jam. It is also used as a pizza crust. Frozen malawah is commonly available in grocery stores across the nation, by brands such as Ta'amti, and Osem, and is exported abroad to kosher supermarkets in the United States, United Kingdom, Canada, France, and other nations. Frozen malawach can be used as a substitute for dough in different recipes such as bourekas, sambusak, and many others.

See also
 Yemenite Jewish cuisine
 Israeli cuisine
 Israeli culture
 Jewish cuisine
 Sephardic Jewish cuisine
 Jachnun
 Kubaneh

References

Yemeni cuisine
Yemenite Jews
Israeli cuisine
Mizrahi Jewish cuisine
Jewish baked goods
Puff pastry